Andreas Poiger (born 4 April 1968) is an Austrian former international footballer.

References

1968 births
Living people
Association football defenders
Austrian footballers
Austria international footballers
Austrian Football Bundesliga players
Wiener Sport-Club players
SK Rapid Wien players
FC Tirol Innsbruck players
SV Stockerau players
Footballers from Vienna